Avraham Aviel (Lipkunski) (born January 20, 1929) is a writer, director of a book distribution agency called Beith Alim, and a witness in the Eichmann trial.

Biography 

Born in Poland, in the Jewish village of Dowgalishok, to Moshe David and Sara Mina. He acquired Torah education at a small yeshiva in Radun, the town of Chafetz Chaim. 

On May 10, 1942, at the age of 13, he witnessed the extermination of the Jews of Radon and the surrounding region in the death pits. He fled to the forests and fought against the Nazis until liberation.  He lost his family in the Holocaust, during which he witnessed the murder of his brother Pinchas before his own eyes.

In 1945 he reached northern Italy and stayed at the Sciesopoli House, which became the home of Aliyat Hanoar institution of the Selvino children. He illegally sailed to Mandate Palestine on the ship "Katriel Yaffe", was captured by the British and exiled to Cyprus, finally entering Israel at the end of 1946. His first home in Israel was in Kibbutz Mishmar Hasharon.  At the beginning of 1948, he enlisted in the Sixth Battalion of the Palmach and fought to open the way to Jerusalem.

At the Eichmann trial in 1961, he appeared as a witness for the prosecution and in his testimony recounted the extermination of the Jews of Radon as an example of the tragic story of Lithuanian Jews and the life of the partisans in the forests.

Avraham Aviel has written three books:

• "A village named Dowgalishok " tells about life in the town before the Holocaust, life in the ghetto, the murder of the town's Jews, his escape to the forest and life in the forest until liberation.

• "Freedom and Loneliness" focuses on the years 1945–1948, the period between the Holocaust and the revival.  It recounts chapters from the story of the children of Selvino during the war years and their journey to Eretz Israel.

• "A family from two twigs, a living testimony" tells about the world that disappeared and the Holocaust, mainly appealing to the younger generation.

On Holocaust Martyrs' and Heroes' Remembrance Day 2011, he lit the sixth torch at the main ceremony held at Yad Vashem.

In 2018 he received a certificate of appreciation in honor of Nechama Pochatchevsky (Nefesh) from the Association of Hebrew Writers for his work in promoting Hebrew literature and poetry.

His story culminated the state ceremony "Every man has a name" that took place in the Knesset on Holocaust Remembrance Day 2018 in the presence of the Speaker of the Knesset, the Prime Minister and the President of the Supreme Court.

Since 1958 he has been engaged in the book industry. He was married to Ayala Liberman, a native of the city of Równe (Rivne – Ukrainian, Rovno- Russian), until her death in 2017. The couple has three children, nine grandchildren and seven great-grandchildren.

His books 
• A village named Dowgalishok, Ministry of Defense Press, 1995.

o The English edition was published in London: Avraham Aviel, A Village Named Dowgalishok: The Massacre at Radun and Eishishok, Vallentine Mitchell & Co Ltd. 

• Freedom and Loneliness, Tammuz Publishing - Writers' Association, 2000 

o The English edition has been published in Israel: Avraham Aviel, Freedom & Loneliness, KIP Ltd. 

• A Family from Two Twigs, living testimony, Beith Alim Publishing, 2017.

o The English edition was published in Israel: Avraham Aviel, A Family from Two Twigs, Living Testimony, Beith Alim.

References

External Links 
• Avraham Aviel on the Yad Vashem website. https://www.yadvashem.org/remembrance/archive/torchlighters/aviel.html 

•Testimony of Avraham Aviel at the trial of Adolf Eichmann. Israel Ministry of Justice, protocols of Eichmann trial, Volume A, 29th meeting, pages 422-426. https://www.justice.gov.il/Subjects/EichmannWritten/Pages/A.aspx

•The testimony of Avraham Aviel in the Eichmann trial-video. The testimony begins 2:25 minutes from the beginning of the film. https://www.youtube.com/watch?v=GHZYqHGbJIQ&feature=player_detailpage#t=145s

• "...But Who Could I Pray For?"- the story of Avraham Aviel. A film produced by the Central School for Holocaust Studies, Yad Vashem and the Multimedia Center, The Hebrew University of Jerusalem. https://www.yadvashem.org/education/testimony-films/avraham-aviel.html

• "...But Who Could I Pray For " - the movie in Hebrew https://www.youtube.com/watch?v=gpAeKbkecZM&feature=youtu.be

• Faith in the presence of the Holocaust An interview with Avraham Aviel. Yad Vashem: Education and e-teaching. https://www.yadvashem.org/he/articles/interviews/avraham-aviel.html

• The journey of torment on the ship "Katriel Yaffe", at the Palim site. http://www.palyam.org/Hahapala/Teur_haflagot/KY_maapil_story

• The torch lighting ceremony 2011 to mark Holocaust Martyrs 'and Heroes' Remembrance Day. https://www.youtube.com/watch?v=irD5sTql4r0&feature=emb_logo

• Details regarding his participation in the partisan forces. http://thepartisan.org/document/68555,0,781.aspx

• Interview with Avraham Aviel - The Fate of the Radon Jewish Community in the Holocaust - on Yad Vashem's YouTube Channel. https://www.youtube.com/watch?v=XP_oqbd3-mc

• Interview with Avraham Aviel - The Power to Tell / Noam Damski – A moving meeting with the witness Avraham Aviel. https://www.youtube.com/watch?v=eKisNO3xHVc

• The state ceremony "Everyone has a name" in the Knesset on Holocaust Day 2018. https://www.youtube.com/watch?v=xpeDOE-Hxg0

• Interview with Avraham Aviel - Knesset Channel Holocaust Remembrance Day 12.4.2018. https://www.youtube.com/watch?v=8Ub4kHFriuQ&feature=youtu.be

• We Chose Life: Holocaust Survivors and the State of Israel - Yad Vashem Online Exhibition. https://www.yadvashem.org/he/remembrance/survivors/aviel.html

1929 births
Living people